The Museo d'Arte Moderna di Bologna or MAMbo is a purpose-designed museum of modern and experimental art in Bologna, Italy. The , which displays a large collection of works by Giorgio Morandi, is temporarily housed in a part of it.

History

Now an independent entity, MAMbo was originally one of the three museums that came under the aegis of the Galleria d'Arte Moderna of Bologna, founded in 1925; the other two being the Modern Art Gallery at Villa delle Rose and the Morandi Museum in the city's main square, Piazza Maggiore.

Independence

MAMbo came into existence as a separate entity in the 1990s, when the collections of the Galleria d'Arte Moderna had grown so large by acquisition and bequest that new premises needed to be found for its contemporary art collection and exhibitions.

New role and mission

Sassoli de Bianchi formulated a bold programme that has repositioned the museum with a precise cultural role not just in Bologna but in Italy. The project brought the museum purpose-designed new premises within the shell of an extensive former industrial bakery in the Porto district of Bologna and a new corporate identity and name, or rather acronym, as MAMbo. Above all, however, it tightened the museum’s focus from contemporary art in general to experimental art in particular - a focus rare in Italy, yet rooted in Bologna's artistic and university heritage.

Supporting this focus on experimental art, Sassoli de Bianchi brought the young art critic and museum manager Gianfranco Maraniello; into the project in 2005, appointing him Director.

The museum simultaneously gained a new mission, not just as a permanent exhibition and exhibition space, but as an experimental, informational and social hub for young contemporary artists, providing a regional, national and international context, the latter through the International Contemporary Art Network.

Reopening

The new premises opened on 5 May 2007 and in their first year hosted a range of exhibitions, installations, performances, musical events, films and multimedia experiences which quickly established MAMbo's reputation as a leading experimental museum in Italy and one of Europe's foremost creative centres of contemporary art. MAMbo is a leading partner in the Didart art teaching project supported by the EU Culture Programme.

References

Art museums and galleries in Bologna
Contemporary art galleries in Italy
Modern art museums in Italy
Art museums established in 2007
2007 establishments in Italy